Semenchenko is a surname of Ukrainian-language origin. Notable people with the surname include:

 Natalya Semenchenko (born 1979), Ukrainian journalist
 Olesia Semenchenko (born 1979), Ukrainian handballer
 Semen Semenchenko (born 1974), Ukrainian politician

See also
 

Ukrainian-language surnames